Baz Bachcheh (also Romanized as Bāz Bachcheh; also known as Baz Bacheh, Bāzīcheh, and Bāzīchi) is a village in Shahr Meyan Rural District, in the Central District of Eqlid County, Fars Province, Iran. At the 2006 census, its population was 531, with 124 families.

References 

Populated places in Eqlid County